A statue menhir is a type of carved standing stone created during the later European Neolithic.

The statues consist of a vertical slab or pillar with a stylised design of a human figure cut into it, sometimes with hints of clothing or weapons visible.

Locations
They are most commonly found in southern and western France, Catalonia, Corsica, Sardinia, Italy and the Alps. A group from the Iron Age also is known in Liguria and Lunigiana.

There are two in Guernsey, La Gran' Mère du Chimquière ('the Grandmother of the Cemetery'), a highly detailed example in the churchyard of Parish of Saint Martin, and another known simply as La Gran' Mère in the Parish of Castel. The latter is an earlier, less detailed example found buried underneath the porch of the parish church.

See also
Kurgan stele
Megalithic art

References

External links

 Website about statue menhirs in southern France
 Southern France Megaliths
 A. Soutou, "La ceinture des statues-menhirs du Haut-Languedoc : essai de datation", in Bulletin de la Société préhistorique française, 1959, Vol. 56 Issue 11-12, pp. 715-721

Further reading
 Maillé, M. 2010 - Hommes et femmes de pierre, Statues-menhirs du Rouergue et du Haut Languedoc, AEP,  monographie, 538 pages, 2010.
Martínez, P.; Fortó, A. Rufo, V. 2010, La estatua-menhir de Ca l'Estrada (Canovelles, Barcelona), una representación con elementos del grupo figurativo de la Rouergue (Aveyron, Francia),  Munibe suplemento 32 |data =2007 |pàgines = p. 498-505 |lloc =Beasain.  
Martínez, P. 2011, La estatua-menhir del Pla de les Pruneres (Mollet del Vallès) Complutum, 2011, Vol. 22 (1): 71–87. Universidad Complutense de Madrid. Madrid. 
Moya, A.; Martínez, P.; López, J.B. 2010, Èssers de pedra. Estàtues-menhirs i esteles antropomorfes a l'art megalític de Catalunya Cypsela núm 18, pp 11–41. Museu d'Arqueologia de Catalunya, Girona.
 Servelle, Ch. 2009 - « Étude pétroarchéologique et technologique de la statue-menhir du Baïssas, Le Bez, Tarn », Archéologie Tarnaise, n° 14, 2009, p. 115-121, 4 fig.
 Vaquer, J. et Maillé, M. 2011 - « Images de guerrier au Néolithique final - Chalcolithique dans le midi de la France : les poignards – figurations sur les statues-menhirs rouergates et objets réels », in L’armement du guerrier dans les sociétés anciennes : de l’objet à la tombe, Actes de la table ronde internationale et interdisciplinaire, Sens, CEREP, 4 juin 2009. Dijon, éd. universitaires de Dijon, p. 103-120.

Outdoor sculptures
Death customs

Prehistoric art
Types of monuments and memorials
Stone Age Europe
Stones